Mayor Meenakshi is a 1976 Indian Tamil-language drama film, directed by Madurai Thirumaran. The film story was written by Suki Subramaniyam. Music was by M. S. Viswanathan. It stars K. R. Vijaya playing titular role, with Jaishankar, V. K. Ramasamy and Cho. Vijayakumar and Sripriya make cameo appearances.

Plot
The film revolves around Meenakshi, who rises from an ordinary housewife to become a Mayor and the trials and tribulations she faces to maintain a balance at work and at home.

Cast
 K. R. Vijaya
 Jaishankar
 Vijayakumar
 Sripriya
 M. N. Rajam
 Manorama
 V. K. Ramasamy
 Cho
 Thengai Srinivasan
 Suruli Rajan
 Baby Rohini
 V. S. Raghavan
 K. Kannan
 K. V. Udaiyappa
 A. Veerasamy
 Shanmugam
 Typist Gopu
 Rowdy Rathinam
 T. K. S. Natarajan
 Subburaman

Production
According to historian Vamanan, Mayor Meenakshi established K. R. Vijaya as the "ideal mother figure", prior to which she appeared mainly in "family-centric films".

Soundtrack
Music was by M. S. Viswanathan. Songs were written by Kannadasan and Vaali.

Reception
Kanthan of Kalki in his review felt the makers never bothered with a script since a popular actress is coming as the heroine, many incidents have been fabricated to make her more attractive and the screenplay has been prepared as a flower show and concluded the review by questioning how do they make films like this.

References

External links
 

1970s Tamil-language films
1976 drama films
1976 films
Films about women in India
Films scored by M. S. Viswanathan
Films set in 1976
Indian drama films
Indian feminist films